The song "Great Green Gobs of Greasy, Grimy Gopher Guts" is a children's public domain playground song popular throughout the United States. Dating back to at least the mid-20th century, the song is sung to the tune of "The Old Gray Mare". The song, especially popular in school lunchrooms and at summer camps, presents macabre horrors through cheerful comedy while allowing children to explore taboo images and words especially as they relate to standards of cleanliness and dining. Many local and regional variations of the lyrics exist, but whatever variant, they always entail extensive use of the literary phonetic device known as an alliteration which helps to provide an amusing description of animal body parts and fluids not normally consumed by Americans.

A recording of the song by Mika Seeger was included in a 1959 Folkways release entitled The Sounds of Camp, as a short track titled "Jingle" in the digital version.  This recording was subsequently rereleased on a 1990 Smithsonian Folkways compilation titled A Fish That's a Song, a collection of traditional public domain children's songs from the United States, with liner notes that include the lyrics:
Great green globs of greasy, grimy gopher guts,
Mutilated monkey meat.
Dirty little birdie feet.
Great green globs of greasy, grimy gopher guts,
And me without my spoon.

See also
Children's street culture
Dead Skunk

References

Further reading
Josepha Sherman and T.K.F. Weisskopf, Greasy Grimy Gopher Guts: The Subversive Folklore of Childhood (August House, 1995).
Pifer, Lynn."Greasy Grimy Gopher Guts: The Subversive Folklore of Childhood." review of book by Sherman and Weisskopf).  Journal of American Folklore. Washington: Winter 1997.Vol.110, Iss. 435;  pg. 105
del Negro, Janice. "Professional reading—Greasy Grimy Gopher Guts: The Subversive Folklore of Childhood by Josepha Sherman and T. K. F. Weiskopt." book review in  The Booklist. Chicago: April 15, 1996.Vol.92, Iss. 16;  pg. 1448
Ian Turner, June Factor, Wendy Lowenstein, Cinderella Dressed in Yella, 2nd Edition (Heinemann, 1978).

Traditional children's songs
Children's street culture
American folk songs
English children's songs